The 2014 A-League All Stars Game was a football match that took place on 10 August 2014 at ANZ Stadium in Sydney, contested between the A-League All Stars and Italian Serie A champions Juventus.

Background
On 20 December 2013, it was confirmed that Juventus would compete against the All-Stars team on 10 August 2014, again hosted in Sydney. On 18 February 2014, it was announced that former Juventus and current Sydney FC captain Alessandro Del Piero will captain the All-Stars squad. It will be the first time Del Piero has played a match against his former club. On 7 April 2014, it was announced Adelaide United coach Josep Gombau will coach the All-Stars squad, chosen by fans who voted.

Matthew Spiranovic was ruled out of the A-League All Stars squad due to an ankle injury.

A-League All Stars players

Match

Details

Man of the Match:
Thomas Broich (A-League All Stars)

Statistics

Broadcasting
In Australia, the match was broadcast live by the Seven Network on their channel 7mate.

Sponsorship
A-League All Stars partners:

 Foxtel
 Telstra
 NSW Government
 BLK

References

2014
All Stars Game
A-League All Stars Game 2014